The women's team table tennis event at the 2015 Pan American Games will be held between the 19 and 21 of July at the Atos Markham Pan Am Centre in Toronto, Canada. The winners of each the individual events will qualify to compete at the 2016 Summer Olympics in Rio de Janeiro, Brazil.

Schedule
All times are Central Standard Time (UTC-6).

Results

Round Robin
The round robin will be used as a qualification round. The twelve teams will be split into groups of four. The top two teams from each group will advance to the first round of playoffs.

Group A

Group B

Group C

Group D

Playoffs

Final classification

References

Table tennis at the 2015 Pan American Games